Zhang Xueming (1908 - April 9, 1983) was a Chinese soldier and politician. He served as the mayor of Tianjin in 1931, during the Japanese invasion of Manchuria, before being forced into exile. After the Second World War, Zhang defected from the Kuomintang and joined the Communist forces during the Chinese Civil War.

Biography
Zhang Xueming was the second son of Zhang Zuolin; like his father, Xueming was also born in Haicheng. Xueming was a full brother of the famed "Young Marshal", Chang Hsüeh-liang (Zhang Xueliang).

In 1928, Zhang studied at the Japanese Infantry Training School, returning in 1929, when he began to work for the Northeastern Army. By October 1930, during the Central Plains War, he, with the support of Chiang Kai-shek and the recommendation of Kuomintang (KMT) elder Wu Tiecheng, became the police chief in Tianjin. In April 1931, he became the mayor of Tianjin.

Within a few months, amid the backdrop of the Japanese invasion of Manchuria, Tianjin was wracked with disorder and riot, which was not helped by the presence of the Tianjin concessions, which included, among the four major concessions, a concession to Japan, which just happened to be the one closest to the areas of the city inhabited by the Chinese. Given the significant disorder, Zhang was forced to declare martial law again and again.

November 1931 proved a critical month for him: numerous riots, disorders, and fighting broke out, on the ninth, the eleventh, and the twenty-sixth; time and again, the Japanese shelled the city. On the ninth, the Japanese fomented a mob that attacked Chinese police, shelled the city, and left four dead. The clash of the eleventh included declarations of martial law as far as Beijing and Shanghai, the seizure of Nankai University by armed rebels, the shelling of schools by the Japanese, and calls for war; the clean-up lasted until the fifteenth, during which Zhang offered money and pardons to all those who surrendered their arms. Finally, on the evening of November 26, rioters and irregulars, including Chinese gendarmes, likely under the command of Mayor Zhang, attacked the Japanese and Italian concessions, prompting shells from both, protests from the Japanese, and martial law in all the concessions; the fighting raged for days before ending by agreement on the 30th, leaving at least eighteen dead. After protests from the Japanese minister, the Nanjing government reacted with compromise and concessions, forcing the resignation of Zhang Xueming on December 6. He then left China to study abroad.

After initially living in Europe and Hong Kong before and during the Second World War, the Pacific War and the fall of Hong Kong forced Zhang to return to the mainland, returning to Nanjing. The Wang Jingwei regime was forced to accept him, and even appointed him onto their military commission in 1943.

Zhang Xueming's activities were not fully investigated at the end of the war, and so he was appointed a lieutenant general in the National Revolutionary Army. Though accounts differ, he either surrendered to the Communists or soon turned on the KMT; regardless, during the Chinese Civil War, he was reported to command a garrison of 50,000 communist troops in Manchuria. (The Communists had promised an independent Manchuria run by the Zhang family, which never came to fruition.)

In 1949, as the fall of the Republic's hold on the mainland neared, Zhang stayed put in Tianjin. Under the tutelage and care of Zhou Enlai, he was spared reprisals; indeed, in 1959, he was invited to attend the third national session of the Chinese People's Political Consultative Conference, most probably as a member of the Revolutionary Committee of the Chinese Kuomintang.

Later, he became the director of the Tianjin People's Park, deputy director of the Municipal Engineering Bureau, deputy director of the Tianjin chapter of the Revolutionary Committee of the Chinese Kuomintang, and, ultimately, a member of the Central Committee of that group.

He died on April 9, 1983, in Beijing, at the age of 75.

Personal life

Zhang had a daughter with his first wife, Mrs. Yao, Zhang Lu E; the marriage would end in divorce.

As Zhang left China to go into exile, he encountered a group of secondary school students; one of whom, Zhu Luo Jun, became his second wife. With her, he also had two sons: his eldest son, Zhang Yuan Chong, was a businessman in Hong Kong; the second son, Zhang Pengju (张鹏举), worked at the Tianjin Municipal Engineering Bureau.

After the war, Zhang Xueming lived in the former British concession in Tianjin, on Hong Kong Road (now No. 50 South Road Mu).

References 

1908 births
1983 deaths
Republic of China politicians from Liaoning
Members of the Kuomintang
Members of the Revolutionary Committee of the Chinese Kuomintang
People of the Central Plains War
People's Republic of China politicians from Liaoning
Chinese police officers
People from Haicheng, Liaoning
Politicians from Anshan
Mayors of Tianjin
National Revolutionary Army generals from Liaoning